A cell site, cell phone tower, or cellular base station is a cellular-enabled mobile device site where antennas and electronic communications equipment are placed (typically on a radio mast, tower, or other raised structure) to create a cell, or adjacent cells, in a cellular network.  The raised structure typically supports antenna and one or more sets of transmitter/receivers transceivers, digital signal processors, control electronics, a GPS receiver for timing (for CDMA2000/IS-95 or GSM systems), primary and backup electrical power sources, and sheltering.

Multiple cellular providers often save money by mounting their antennas on a common shared mast; since separate systems use different frequencies, antennas can be located close together without interfering with each other. Some provider companies operate multiple cellular networks and similarly use colocated base stations for two or more cellular networks, (CDMA2000 or GSM, for example).

Some cities require that cell sites be inconspicuous; they can be blended with the surrounding area or mounted on buildings or advertising towers. Preserved treescapes can often hide cell towers inside an artificial or preserved tree. These installations are generally referred to as concealed cell sites or stealth cell sites.

Overview 

A cellular network is a network of handheld mobile phones (cell phones) in which each phone communicates with the telephone network by radio waves through a local antenna at a cellular base station (cell site).  The coverage area in which service is provided is divided into a mosaic of small geographical areas called "cells", each served by a separate low power multichannel transceiver and antenna at a base station.  All the cell phones within a cell communicate with the system through that cell's antenna, on separate frequency channels assigned by the base station from a common pool of frequencies used by the system.

The purpose of cellular organization is to conserve radio bandwidth by frequency reuse; the low power radio signals used within each cell do not travel far beyond the cell, so the radio channels can be reused in geographically separated cells.  When a mobile user moves from one cell to another, their phone is automatically "handed off" to the new cell's antenna, and assigned a new set of frequencies, and subsequently communicates with this antenna.  This background handoff process is imperceptible to the user and can occur in the middle of a phone call without any service interruption.  Each cell phone has an automated full duplex digital transceiver and communicates with the cell antenna over two digital radio channels in the UHF or microwave band, one for each direction of the bidirectional conversation, plus a control channel which handles registering the phone with the network, dialing, and the handoff process.

Typically a cell tower is located at the edge of one or more cells and covers multiple cells using directional antennas.  A common geometry is to locate the cell site at the intersection of three adjacent cells, with three antennas at 120° angles each covering one cell. The type of antenna used for cellular base stations (vertical white rectangles in pictures), called a sector antenna, usually consists of a vertical collinear array of dipoles. It has a flat fan-shaped radiation pattern, which is tilted slightly down to cover the cell area without radiating at higher angles into further off cells which reuse the same frequencies.  The elevation angle of the antenna must be carefully adjusted, so the beam covers the entire cell without radiating too far.  In modern sector antennas beam tilt can usually be adjusted electronically, to avoid the necessity of a lineman climbing the tower to mechanically tilt the antenna when adjustment is needed.

Operation

Range 

The working range of a cell site (the range which mobile devices connects reliably to the cell site) is not a fixed figure. It will depend on a number of factors, including, but not limited to: 
 Height of antenna over surrounding terrain (Line-of-sight propagation).
 The frequency of signal in use.
 The transmitter's rated power.
 The required uplink/downlink data rate of the subscriber's device
 The directional characteristics of the site antenna array.
 Reflection and absorption of radio energy by buildings or vegetation.
 It may also be limited by local geographical or regulatory factors and weather conditions.
 In addition there are timing limitations in some technologies (e.g., even in free space, GSM would be limited to 150 km, with 180 km being possible with special equipment)

Generally, in areas where there are enough cell sites to cover a wide area, the range of each one will be set to:
 Ensure there is enough overlap for "handover" to/from other sites (moving the signal for a mobile device from one cell site to another, for those technologies that can handle it - e.g. making a GSM phone call while in a car or train).
 Ensure that the overlap area is not too large, to minimize interference problems with other sites.

In practice, cell sites are grouped in areas of high population density, with the most potential users. Cell phone traffic through a single site is limited by the base station's capacity; there is a finite number of calls or data traffic that a base station can handle at once. This capacity limitation is commonly the factor that determines the spacing of cell mast sites.

The maximum range of a mast (where it is not limited by interference with other masts nearby) depends on the same considerations. In any case the limiting factor is the ability of a low-powered personal cell phone to transmit back to the mast. When the terrain is hilly, the maximum distance can vary from as little as  due to encroachment of intermediate objects into the wide center fresnel zone of the signal. CDMA and IDEN have no such limit defined by timing.

Practical example of range 
 3G/4G/5G (FR1) Mobile base station tower: it is technically possible to cover up to 50–150 km. (Macrocell)
 5G (FR2) Mobile base station: the distances between the 5G base-station is about 250–300 m, due to the use of millimetre waves.

Channel reuse 
The concept of "maximum" range is misleading in a cellular network. Cellular networks are designed to support many conversations with a limited number of radio channels (slices of radio frequency spectrum necessary to make one conversation) that are licensed to an operator of a cellular service. To overcome this limitation, it is necessary to repeat and reuse the same channels at different locations. Just as a car radio changes from one local station to a completely different local station with the same frequency when traveling to another city, the same radio channel gets reused on a cell mast only a few miles away. To do this, the signal of a cell mast is intentionally kept at low power and in many cases tilted downward to limit its reach. This allows covering an area small enough not to have to support more conversations than the available channels can carry. Due to the sectorized arrangement of antennas on a tower, it is possible to vary the strength and angle for each sector depending on the coverage from other towers in the area.

Signal limiting factor 
A cellphone may not work at times because it is too far from a mast, or because the phone is in a location where cell phone signals are attenuated by thick building walls, hills, or other structures. The signals do not need a clear line of sight but greater radio interference will degrade or eliminate reception. When many people try to use the cell mast at the same time, e.g. during a traffic jam or a sports event, then there will be a signal on the phone display but it is blocked from starting a new connection. The other limiting factor for cell phones is the ability to send a signal from its low powered battery to the cell site. Some cellphones perform better than others under low power or low battery, typically due to the ability to send a good signal from the phone to the mast.

The base station controller (a central computer that specializes in making phone connections) and the intelligence of the cellphone keeps track of and allows the phone to switch from one mast to the next during conversation. As the user moves towards a mast it picks the strongest signal and releases the mast from which the signal has become weaker; that channel on that mast becomes available to another user.

Geolocation

Cellular geolocation is less precise than by GNSS (e.g. GPS), but it is available to devices that do not have GPS receivers and where the GNSS is not available. The precision of this system varies and is highest where advanced forward link methods are possible and is lowest where only a single cell site can be reached, in which case the location is only known to be within the coverage of that site.

An advanced forward link is where a device is within range of at least three cell sites and where the carrier has implemented timing system use.

Another method is using angle of arrival (AoA) and it occurs when the device is in range of at least two cell sites, produces intermediate precision. Assisted GPS uses both satellite and cell phone signals.

In the United States, for emergency calling service using location data (locally called "Enhanced 911"), it was required that at least 95% of cellular phones in use on 31 December 2005 support such service. Many carriers missed this deadline and were fined by the Federal Communications Commission.

Radio power and health 

According to the U.S. Federal Communications Commission: "Measurement data obtained from various sources have consistently indicated that 'worst-case' ground-level power densities near typical cellular towers are on the order of 1 µW/cm² (or 10 mW/m²) or less (usually significantly less)."

Cell phones, cell towers, wi-fi, smart meters, digital enhanced cordless telecommunications phones, cordless phones, baby monitors, and other wireless devices all emit non-ionizing radio frequencies, which the World Health Organization (WHO) has classified as a "potential" carcinogen, According to the U.S. National Cancer Institute, "No mechanism by which ELF-EMFs or radiofrequency radiation could cause  cancer has been identified."

According to the U.S. Food and Drug Administration, "Scientific consensus shows that non-ionizing radiation is not a carcinogen and, at or below the radio frequency exposure limits set by the FCC, non-ionizing radiation has not been shown to cause any harm to people."

Temporary sites 

Although cell antennas are normally attached to permanent structures, carriers also maintain fleets of vehicles, called cells-on-wheels (COWs), that serve as temporary cell sites. A generator may be included for use where network electrical power is not available, and the system may have a wireless backhaul link allowing use where a wired link is not available.

COWs are also used at permanent cell sites—as temporary replacements for damaged equipment, during planned outages, and to augment capacity such as during conventions.

Employment
Cell site workers are called tower climbers or transmission tower workers.

Spy agency setup
According to documents leaked to Der Spiegel, the NSA sells a $40,000 "active GSM base station" to be used as a tool to mimic a mobile phone tower and thus monitor cell phones.

In November 2014, The Wall Street Journal reported that the Technical Operations Group of the U.S. Marshals utilizes spy devices, known as "dirtboxes", to mimic powerful cell tower signals. Such devices are designed to cause mobile phones to switch over to the tower, as it is the strongest signal within reach. The devices are placed on airplanes to effectively create a "dragnet", gathering data about phones as the planes travel above populated areas.

Off-grid systems 

An off-grid cell site is not connected to the public electrical grid. Usually the system is off-the-grid because of difficult access or lack of infrastructure. Fuel cell or other backup power systems are added to critical cell sites to provide day-to-day and emergency power. Traditionally, sites have used internal-combustion-engine-driven generator sets, however, being less efficient than public power, they increase operating expense and are a source of pollution (atmospheric, acoustic, etc.) and some are in areas protected by environment and landscape conservation.

Renewable sources, such as solar power and wind power may be available where cell sites are placed. The first off-grid mast in the UK was installed in 2022 in Eglwyswrw, Wales. This can reduce the cost of fuel to the cell site or telecom tower by up to 75%. They can be backed up by a fuel generator system which allows the cell site to work when the renewable sources are not enough. One such energy production system consists of:
 Solar power generator
 Wind generator
 Electro-chemical generator fuel cells

Electrical energy from intermittent sources is stored in secondary batteries which are usually designed to have an average of two days of self-sufficiency, also known as autonomy, to allow time for maintenance personnel to arrive at site when a repair is needed.

The renewable energy systems supply electrical power when available. The fuel cells are activated only when the natural sources are not enough to supply the energy the system needs. The emergency power supply (the fuel cells) is designed to last an average of ten days. In this way the structure is completely self-sufficient: this enables the maintenance team to pay only few visits to the site, since it is usually hard to get to.

Camouflage

There is often local opposition to new masts for reasons of safety and appearance. The latter is sometimes tackled by disguising the mast as something else, such as a flag pole, street lamp, or a tree (e.g. palm trees, pine trees, cypress) or rooftop structures or urban features such as chimneys or panels.

These concealed cell sites can distinguish themselves by foliage shape and bark type. The foliage of all these antennas is composed of leaves made of plastic material accurately designed, taking into consideration quantity, shape and array suitable to completely conceal the antennas and all accessory parts in a natural manner. The materials used guarantee absolute radio-electric transparency and resistance to UVA rays. Nicknames include "monopalm" for a monopole disguised as a palm tree or "Pseudopinus telephoneyensis" for a mast disguised as a pine tree. In monopoles, the directional antennas are sometimes hidden in a plastic housing near the top of the pole so that the crossbars can be eliminated.

Rooftop structures such as concealment chimneys or panels, 6 to 12 meters high, may conceal one or more mobile telephone operators on the same station. Roofmask panels can be fixed to existing rooftop structures, restyling them quickly and cheaply.

Miniature
Researchers at Alcatel-Lucent have developed a cell site called lightRadio that fits in the palm of hand. It is the size of a Rubik's cube. It is capable of relaying 2G, 3G and 4G signals. They are more energy efficient and deliver broadband more efficiently than current cell sites. They could be used in very populated urban areas to make room for more radio space.

See also

 Cellular network
 Node B
 OpenBTS
 Mobile phone radiation and health
 Telecom infrastructure sharing
 Base transceiver station
 Radio masts and towers
 Mobile cell sites
 Distributed antenna system
 Telecommunications lease 
 Title 47 of the Code of Federal Regulations
 In re Application of the United States for Historical Cell Site Data
 Tower climber

References

External links
Maps of All Towers Across the United Kingdom
FCC: Universal Licensing Information
FCC: Information On Human Exposure To Radio frequency Fields From Cellular and PCS Radio Transmitters
Australian Radiation Protection and Nuclear Safety Agency (ARPANSA) Base Station Survey 2007- 2011

Telecommunications infrastructure
Radio masts and towers